Olin Library may refer to:

Libraries named after Stephen Olin:
 Olin Library at Wesleyan University

Libraries named after John M. Olin:
 Olin Library at Cornell University Library
 Olin Library at Washington University Libraries

Libraries named after Franklin W. Olin:
 The library at Olin College of Engineering
 Olin Library at Rollins College
 F. W. Olin Library at Mills College
 Olin Science Library at Colby College